{{Infobox award
| name          = San Francisco Film Critics Circle Award for Best Director
| image         = File:Jane Campion DNZM (cropped).jpg
| image_upright = 0.7
| caption       = The 2021 recipient: Jane Campion
| awarded_for   = Excellence in Cinematic Direction Achievement
| presenter     = San Francisco Film Critics Circle
| country       = United States
| year          = Todd Haynes  Far from Heaven (2002)
| holder        = Jane Campion  The Power of the Dog''(2021)
| website       = 
}}

The San Francisco Film Critics Circle Award for Best Director''' is an award given by the San Francisco Film Critics Circle to honor a film director who has delivered an outstanding directing while working in the film industry.

Winners

2000s

2010s

2020s

Awards for best director